Cytochrome c nitrite reductase (ccNiR) is a bacterial enzyme that catalyzes the six electron reduction of nitrite to ammonia; an important step in the biological nitrogen cycle. The enzyme catalyses the second step in the two step conversion of nitrate to ammonia, which allows certain bacteria to use nitrite as a terminal electron acceptor, rather than oxygen, during anaerobic conditions. During this process, ccNiR draws electrons from the quinol pool, which are ultimately provided by a dehydrogenase such as formate dehydrogenase or hydrogenase. These dehydrogenases are responsible for generating a proton motive force.

Cytochrome c Nitrite Reductase is a homodimer which contains five c-type heme cofactors per monomer. Four of the heme centers are bis-histidine ligated and presumably serve to shuttle electrons to the active site. The active site heme, however, is uniquely ligated by a single lysine residue.

This enzyme belongs to the family of oxidoreductases, specifically those acting on other nitrogenous compounds as donors with a cytochrome as acceptor.  The systematic name of this enzyme class is ammonia:ferricytochrome-c oxidoreductase.

References

Further reading 

 

EC 1.7.2
Enzymes of known structure